The 2015–16 FIS Ski Jumping World Cup was the 37th World Cup season in ski jumping for men, the 19th official World Cup season in ski flying and the 5th World Cup season for ladies. It began on 21 November 2015 in Klingenthal, Germany and concluded on 20 March 2016 in Planica, Slovenia.

For men, the title holders from the previous season were Severin Freund in overall, Peter Prevc in ski flying, and Germany in the nations cup. For ladies, Daniela Iraschko-Stolz was defending the overall title and Austria the nations cup.

Almaty and the country of Kazakhstan hosted ski jumping World Cup events for the first time in history. Several events had to be cancelled or rescheduled to other venues due to weather conditions. The cancelled individual event from Titisee-Neustadt was replaced in Planica on 17 March 2016, which meant that Letalnica bratov Gorišek became the first hill in history to host four World Cup events in a row.

Map of world cup hosts 
All 24 locations hosting world cup events for men (21) and ladies (10) in this season. Events in Kuusamo/Ruka and Râșnov were completely canceled.

 Four Hills Tournament

Men

Summary 
Peter Prevc, who was the runner-up in the previous two seasons, dominated the men's season. Prevc secured his first World Cup title by winning the second event in Almaty, six events before the end of the season. At the end of the season, Prevc broke several statistical records. He won the highest number of points in a single season (2303, the previous record being 2083 of Gregor Schlierenzauer from the 2008/09 season) and also recorded the highest number of victories, podium finishes, and average points per event in a season (15 victories, 22 podiums, and 79.41 points on average, the previous records being 13 victories, 20 podiums, and 77.15 points on average from Schlierenzauer's 2008/09 season). The point difference between the first and the second, 813 points, was also the highest ever. By winning the sky flying title, Prevc became the first ski jumper to win the title for three years in a row. In the overall standings, the defending champion Severin Freund finished second and Kenneth Gangnes finished third.

Prevc also won the prestigious 64th Four Hills Tournament. The tournament was broadcast in 57 different countries for 200 million viewers around the globe. Prevc won the competition with the highest total score ever with 1139.4 points and won three events out of four. At the FIS Ski Flying World Championships, which did not count for World Cup points, Prevc became the world champion in sky flying.

The event on 19 December 2015 in Engelberg, Switzerland, marked some interesting statistical features: Peter Prevc and Domen Prevc became first brothers in history who shared a ski jumping World Cup podium; Noriaki Kasai became the oldest contestant on a podium at 43 years and 196 days old; for the first time the oldest Noriaki Kasai (43) and the youngest Domen Prevc (16) participant of any competition both on podium and with record age difference between two on podium. The Prevc brothers finished on the podium again in Sapporo, where they were joined by Robert Kranjec.

Prevc also became only the third ski jumper who managed to win the event with falling or touching the ground upon landing, by winning the ski flying event in Vikersund on 14 February. Such a feat was previously achieved only by Andreas Goldberger in 1995 and Martin Schmitt in 1999.

In team events, Norway won three times, Germany twice, and Slovenia once. The Nations Cup was won by Norway, followed by Slovenia and Germany.

A total of 111,000 people (2,500 / 20,500 / 22,500 / 32,500 / 33,000) has gathered at hill test and four days of competitions at the season final in Planica.

Calendar 

Single-round event.

Men's team 

Single-round team event.

Ladies

Summary 
Sara Takanashi of Japan won her third overall title. She won 14 out of 17 events and secured the title several events before the end of the season. Daniela Iraschko-Stolz, the title holder from the previous year, finished second, while Maja Vtič finished third. No team events for ladies or mixed team events were scheduled this season.

The Nations Cup was won by Austria, followed by Japan and Slovenia. Since the last two events of the season were cancelled due to lack of snow, the award ceremony took place in Planica, together with men's.

Calendar 

Single-round team event.

Men's standings

Overall

Nations Cup

Prize money

Four Hills Tournament

Ski Flying

Ladies' standings

Overall

Nations Cup

Prize money

Yellow bib timeline

Men

Ladies

Ski Flying

Four Hills Tournament

Qualifications

Men

Ladies

Head coach

Nations

Achievements
First World Cup career victory
 Daniel-André Tande (21), in his third season – the WC 1 in Klingenthal
 Kenneth Gangnes (26), in his seventh season – the WC 3 in Lillehammer
 Maja Vtič (28), in her fifth season – the WC 13 in Ljubno
 Johann André Forfang (20), in his second season – the WC 26 in Titisee-Neustadt

First World Cup podium 
 Daniel-André Tande (21), in his third season – the WC 1 in Klingenthal
 Kenneth Gangnes (26), in his seventh season – the WC 2 in Lillehammer
 Eva Pinkelnig (27), in her second season – the WC 2 in Nizhny Tagil
 Joachim Hauer (24), in his third season – the WC 4 in Nizhny Tagil
 Domen Prevc (16), in his first season – the WC 6 in Engelberg
 Ema Klinec (17), in her second season – the WC 4 in Sapporo
 Karl Geiger (23), in his fourth season – the WC 21 in Lahti

Number of wins this season (in brackets are all-time wins)
 Peter Prevc – 15 (21)
 Sara Takanashi – 14 (44)
 Severin Freund – 3 (21)
 Michael Hayböck – 3 (4)
 Daniela Iraschko-Stolz – 2 (12)
 Robert Kranjec – 2 (7)
 Roman Koudelka – 1 (5)
 Stefan Kraft – 1 (4)
 Anders Fannemel – 1 (3)
 Daniel-André Tande – 1 (1)
 Kenneth Gangnes – 1 (1)
 Maja Vtič – 1 (1)
 Johann André Forfang – 1 (1)

Footnotes

References

FIS Ski Jumping World Cup
World cup
World cup